Bowen Mountain is a small town in New South Wales, Australia, in the City of Hawkesbury.  It is in the foothills of the Blue Mountains.

The nearest commercial centre is Kurrajong, which lies approximately 5 km to the north-east.

It is named after George M. C. Bowen, an earlier setter of the area.

Features
A large part of Bowen Mountain belongs to the Blue Mountains National Park, which covers an area of 247,000 hectares. The National Park caters extensively for bushwalkers, with many lookouts and more than 140 km of walking tracks.

Bowen Mountain is home to the Crago Observatory, which consists of a computer-guided Dobsonian telescope housed in a large rotating dome. It is operated by the Astronomical Society of NSW.

Demographics
At the 2016 census, the population was 1,571.  Of these: 
 The median age was 35 years, compared to the national median of 38 years.

 55.6% were married and 11.1% were either divorced or separated.
 83.6% of people were born in Australia and 91.1% of people only spoke English at home.

References

External links 
Magnetic Hill

Towns in New South Wales
City of Hawkesbury